Gintaras Leonavičius (born October 29, 1983) is a Lithuanian former professional basketball player, playing as a shooting guard. Born in Panevėžys, Lithuania, he is 6 ft 4.5 in (1.94 m) in height and he weighs 185 lb (84 kg).

References

1983 births
Living people
Lithuanian men's basketball players
Shooting guards
CB Peñas Huesca players
BC Lietkabelis players